Clara Chou or Chou Yuh-kow (born 9 September 1953) is a Taiwanese journalist, television and radio personality.

She currently anchors Chou Chou Breakfast from 7:00 to 9:00 every weekday on Hit FM.

Education
Chou attended National Chengchi University, where she earned a degree in journalism. She then entered Harvard University, where she earned a master's degree, followed by an Executive Master of Science in Business Administration degree at Peking University's Guanghua School of Management.

Political career
Chou supported the Kuomintang, before the party lost power in the 2000 election. After the loss, she publicly supported the Democratic Progressive Party's policies, and ran as a candidate for the Pan-Green Taiwan Solidarity Union in the 2006 Taipei City municipal election. She was expelled from the TSU during her mayoral campaign for suggesting that President Chen Shui-bian resign in the wake of First Lady Wu Shu-chen's indictment for graft, though her name still appeared on the ballot as the TSU candidate. The expulsion was later reduced to a suspension. By 2008, Chou had rejoined the KMT. After Ma Ying-jeou resigned as KMT chair in December 2014, Chou tried to run for the position, but was rejected.

Controversy
In 2014, Chou accused President Ma Ying-jeou of accepting donations from Ting Hsin International Group. At the time, the company was investigated as part of the 2014 Taiwan food scandal. Chou believed Ma had a hand in covering up Ting Hsin's role in the incident. In December, Ma filed two lawsuits against Chou for the comments she made. She countered with a lawsuit against the Kuomintang, targeting acting party chairperson Wu Den-yih. Chou was stripped of her KMT membership later that month, days after she had presented evidence of the party's alleged misdeeds. In December 2015, the Taipei District Prosecutors’ Office indicted Chou on charges of defamation in connection to her comments about Ting Hsin. The first ruling in Ma's court case against Chou was handed down later that month. The Taipei District Court found her not guilty of defamation. Ma appealed the verdict to the Taiwan High Court.

Chou made further accusations of the KMT in June 2015, this time against then-unconfirmed presidential candidate Hung Hsiu-chu, claiming that Hung's master's degree from Northeast Missouri State University was falsified. Hung sued Chou and the Next Magazine employees who first published the accusations. Chou further stated in August that Hung was thinking of ending her presidential run early in return for a legislative position or money. In response, Hung charged Chou with defamation again. That same month, Terry Gou was awarded NT$2 million in his defamation suit against Chou, who had accused Gou of violating the Political Donations Act in January.

Personal
In 1998, Chou claimed that she and Daniel Huang had an affair. She married Lee Hyun-Reng in 2001.

Notes

References

1953 births
Living people
Taiwanese journalists
Taiwanese women journalists
Taiwanese television personalities
Taiwanese radio presenters
21st-century Taiwanese women politicians
21st-century Taiwanese politicians
Taiwan Solidarity Union politicians
Politicians of the Republic of China on Taiwan from Keelung
National Chengchi University alumni
Peking University alumni
Harvard University alumni
Taiwanese women radio presenters